The Piedmontese regional election of 2010 took place on 28–29 March 2010, as part of Italy's round of regional elections.

The incumbent President of the Region, Mercedes Bresso of the centre-left Democratic Party, lost her seat to Roberto Cota, leader of the Northern League Piedmont and floor leader of the Northern League in the Italian Chamber of Deputies, who was backed also by The People of Freedom.  Cota's lead of Bresso was of only 0.4%, in one of the Region's narrowest elections ever. The League thus secured a second region, after having conquered the presidency of Veneto with Luca Zaia with a much more convincing margin.

Electoral system
Regional elections in Piedmont were ruled by the "Tatarella law" (approved in 1995), which provided for a mixed electoral system: four fifths of the regional councilors were elected in provincial constituencies by proportional representation, using the largest remainder method with a droop quota and open lists, while the residual votes and the unassigned seats were grouped into a "single regional constituency", where the whole ratios and the highest remainders were divided with the Hare method among the provincial party lists; one fifth of the council seats instead was reserved for regional lists and assigned with a majoritarian system: the leader of the regional list that scored the highest number of votes was elected to the presidency of the Region while the other candidates were elected regional councilors.

A threshold of 3% had been established for the provincial lists, which, however, could still have entered the regional council if the regional list to which they were connected had scored at least 5% of valid votes.

The panachage was also allowed: the voter can indicate a candidate for the presidency but prefer a provincial list connected to another candidate.

Background
Bresso was one of the last bulwarks of the centre-left in Central Italy and thus all the Democratic Party endorsed her in a key test of the coalition's strength after two years in opposition in Rome.

For his part, Cota's choice was a little bit surprising as Piedmont is not really a stronghold for his party, which is much stronger in Veneto and Lombardy. The day after his bid was announced, Cota explained that it is time to rewrite the history of Italian unification, that was led by the Kingdom of Sardinia under the House of Savoy. Cota underlined that Piedmont was once an independent state and told that even Camillo Benso di Cavour did not intend to unify the whole Italian Peninsula and later favoured a federal reform of the new Kingdom of Italy. For these reasons Cota, who is a republican and has no nostalgia of the House of Savoy, says his message will do well in Piedmont and that he will overcome the weakness of Lega Piemont (that usually gets far fewer votes than Liga Veneta in Veneto and Lega Lombarda in Lombardy). In Cota's view, most of his support will come from industrial workers, including those of Southern descent, and Catholics, embarrassed by Bresso's secularism.

However, the Union of the Centre, whose main aim in the election was to fight back Lega Nord, chose to support Bresso, turning down the chance of running its own candidate (Michele Vietti was the most likely). Most Catholic voters disagreed.

Parties and candidates

Results

References

Elections in Piedmont
2010 elections in Italy